Brissus unicolor is a species of sea urchins of the family Brissidae. Their armour is covered with spines. Brissus unicolor was first scientifically described in 1778 by Nathanael Gottfried Leske.

Habitat
The urchin buries itself in the coarse sand at depths of 6 to 250 meters (which is why it is rarely observed alive). In the Mediterranean Sea they can be sometimes found living buried in the sediment near the tapeweed, Posidonia oceanica.

Description
When alive, the urchin's whole body is covered in brown spines. After the urchin dies, its shell (also called a "test") has a distinctive pattern that consists of many grey spots. These spots are present on the urchin's test temporarily, disappearing after some time, leaving the urchin a white or a pale brown color.

The urchin's test becomes thicker as the urchin matures. The test can reach a length of about 14 cm.

Distribution
This species lives in the Mediterranean Sea and some parts of the Atlantic Ocean.

References

unicolor
Animals described in 1778
Taxa named by Nathanael Gottfried Leske